The Countess of Chester is the main NHS hospital for Chester and its surrounding area. It currently has 625 beds, general medical departments and a 24-hour accident and emergency unit. It is managed by the Countess of Chester Hospital NHS Foundation Trust, one of the first Foundation Trusts in the UK, formed in 2004. Cardiac rehabilitation services at the hospital are provided by Cheshire and Wirral Partnership NHS Foundation Trust.

History

The hospital has its origins in the "Cheshire Lunatic Asylum" which opened on part of the site in 1829. The name of the facility changed to "County Mental Hospital" in 1921, to the "Upton Mental Hospital" on joining the National Health Service in 1948, and then to the "Deva Hospital" in 1950.
 
By 1948, Chester Royal Infirmary specialized in surgery and out-patients and the City Hospital, Hoole, in chronic illnesses, chest, maternity, paediatric, and general medical cases. Pre-war plans for the expansion of the Infirmary were eventually revived. In 1963 a large out-patient and casualty department was opened at the infirmary; this was accompanied with the completion of the Chester inner ring road in 1967. However, after the creation of the West Cheshire HMC (hospital management committee), a fresh decision was taken to focus all the hospital services for the district at a purpose-built site on Liverpool Road, adjacent to the county mental hospital facilities.
 
In 1968, the new site was renamed the "West Cheshire Hospital". The maternity unit at the City Hospital was transferred to a new building at the south end of the site in 1971. With the opening of a new general wing and A&E department in 1983, several surgical departments from the Royal Infirmary were relocated to the new buildings. On 30 May 1984, West Cheshire Hospital was officially renamed the Countess of Chester Hospital by Charles and Diana, then the prince and princess of Wales and also Earl and Countess of Chester. In 1993, the Royal Infirmary site was closed after its remaining departments were transferred to the Countess. The City Hospital, which had become a 120-bed geriatric unit, was closed in 1994 after its services were taken over by the Countess in 1991.
 
In January 2006, the CARE building, sometimes known as Outpatients Four, opened and started providing new facilities the Cardiac Catheter Laboratory, Department of Clinical Audiology, Renal & Urology Department and ENT Department.
 
In 2007, the Countess of Chester became the first hospital in the UK to completely ban smoking for both workers and patients. In April 2014 a new two-storey wing was opened containing a state of the art 21 bed Intensive Care Unit on the first floor, replacing the old HDU and ITU wards. On the ground floor is an expanded endoscopy unit and the bariatric outpatients department.

Services
Part of the old mental health hospital building, now called the 1829 Building, serves as headquarters for West Cheshire Clinical Commissioning Group, Cheshire and Wirral Partnership NHS Foundation Trust, and various other NHS support organisations. The Bowmere mental health hospital is on the same site, as is Ancora House, a purpose-built Child and Adolescent Mental Health Services unit.

In April 2019 it announced that it would no longer provide elective treatment for Welsh patients because the Welsh government were not prepared to pay the full costs. The Welsh government have not increased the tariff for NHS procedures in line with NHS England, so the trust is paid about 8% less for patients from Wales. Rising waiting lists mean the trust can increase the work it does for English patients, which is more remunerative.

Performance

 
Before becoming a foundation trust in 2004, the trust received top 3-star rating in the former national performance charts. In 2016, the CQC rated the hospital as requiring improvement.
 
The Trust lost the contract for sexual health services when Cheshire West and Chester Council awarded it to East Cheshire NHS Trust in December 2014.
 
From 2015 to 2016, the trust cancelled urgent operations 37 times - the highest number of any NHS trust in England.

Investigation into high infant mortality rates 

 
In July 2016, the neonatal intensive care unit at the Countess of Chester Hospital stopped accepting premature infants born before 32 weeks, partially due to an unexplained high mortality rate in 2015 and 2016, instead diverting them to other hospitals in the North West of England, such as Alder Hey.

A series of investigations was initiated to ascertain the reasons for the sharp rise in mortalities, with an independent review being carried out by the Royal College of Paediatrics and Child Health and the Royal College of Nursing. Despite this report finding some staffing levels "inadequate", the Foundation Trust were unable to identify the fundamental cause or causes of the high mortality rate, with the independent report similarly finding "no single cause or factor identified to explain the increase .. seen in [the] mortality numbers". 

In May 2017, the Foundation Trust brought in Cheshire Police to assist with the ongoing review, stating this was to "seek assurances that enable us to rule out unnatural causes of death."
 
On 3 July 2018, Lucy Letby, a registered nurse working at the hospital at the time, was arrested by police on suspicion of eight counts of suspected murder and six counts of attempted murder, following a year-long investigation. The investigation was subsequently widened to include Liverpool Women's Hospital, another location at which Letby had worked. She was bailed on 6 July 2018 as the police continued their enquiries, was rearrested on 10 June 2019 in connection with eight alleged murders and nine alleged attempted murders of babies, and again on 10 November 2020. 

On 11 November 2020, Letby was charged with eight counts of murder and ten counts of attempted murder. Her trial began at Manchester Crown Court on 10 October 2022, and is currently ongoing; the jury was informed that the trial may last up to six months. Letby pleaded not guilty to seven counts of murder and ten counts of attempted murder.

See also

 List of hospitals in England
 List of NHS trusts
Listed buildings in Upton-by-Chester
Chapel at the Countess of Chester Hospital

References

External links
 Exploring Deva Asylum, Aka Countess Of Chester Hospital

Buildings and structures in Chester
Hospital buildings completed in 1984
Hospitals in Cheshire
NHS hospitals in England